Xyloryctes jamaicensis, known generally as the rhinoceros beetle or unicorn beetle, is a species of rhinoceros beetle in the family Scarabaeidae. It is found in North America.

References

Further reading

External links

 

Dynastinae
Articles created by Qbugbot
Beetles described in 1773
Taxa named by Dru Drury